The 2020–21 División de Honor is the 54th season of the División de Honor, the top flight of  Spanish domestic rugby union.

Valladolid won its fifth consecutive title, its eleventh overall, defeating Alcobendas in the final.

Competition format

The División de Honor de Rugby season takes place between October and May.  The COVID-19 pandemic delayed and affected the competition.  Bathco withdrew from the competition due to financial issues, and were replaced with Les Abelles, who beat Hernani, the team which had finished in 12th place in the 2019-20 season, in a playoff.

The pandemic also meant the format for the 2020-21 tournament was altered:

 Each team played each other once, with the top four teams qualifying for the Copa del Rey semifinals, played 1-2 May.
 The league then divided into two groups of six, based on the league table after 11 games. 
 The results between the teams in each group were carried forward to the second stage, and they played each other again. The regular season was thus reduced to 16 games each instead of the usual 22.
 There were eight playoff positions instead of six, meaning the top two from the second group qualified along with all teams from the first group.

Points were awarded according to the following:
4 points for a win
2 points for a draw
1 bonus point is awarded to a team scoring 4 tries or more in a match
1 bonus point is awarded to a team that loses a match by 7 points or fewer

Promotion and relegation 
The second-tier División de Honor B is made up of three regional groups. The top eight teams across the three groups play off; the champion is promoted to División de Honor, at the expense of the team which finishes last in the División de Honor. 

The runner-up plays a further play-off against the team which finishes 11th in the top flight.

Teams

Results

Standings

First stage

Second stage

Group 1

Group 2

Playoffs

Relegation playoff
The relegation playoff was played by Independiente, the team finishing 11th in División de Honor, and Gernika, who lost the División de Honor B promotion playoff final 26-22 to La Vila. 

Gernika won 34–21 and gained promotion to the División de Honor for the 2021–22 season.

References

External links
Official site

Rugby union in Spain
2020-21
 
Spain